Thomas Haubro Lund (born 2 August 1968) is a retired badminton player from Denmark who affiliate with Kastrup Magleby club.

Career 
Lund was one of the world's leading doubles specialists of the 1990s, particularly in mixed doubles. He was a silver medalist in both men's and mixed doubles at the 1991 IBF World Championships. In 1993 and 1995 he won consecutive gold medals in mixed doubles at the IBF World Championships, the first with Sweden's Catrine Bengtsson and the second with his compatriot Marlene Thomsen. From 1990 through 1994 Lund won five consecutive mixed doubles titles with three different partners at the now defunct World Badminton Grand Prix. At the prestigious All England Open he captured titles in both men's doubles (1993) and mixed doubles (1993, 1995). Lund was elected to the World Badminton Hall of Fame in 2008.

Summer Olympics 
Lund competed in badminton at the 1992 Summer Olympics in men's doubles with Jon Holst-Christensen. In the first round they defeated Dean Galt and Kerrin Harrison of New Zealand and in second round they were beaten by Razif Sidek and Jalani Sidek of Malaysia.

He also competed in badminton at the 1996 Summer Olympics in men's doubles with the same partner. They had a bye in the first round and lost against Ha Tae-kwon and Kang Kyung-jin of Korea in the second round.

Major achievements

World Championships 
Men's doubles

World Cup 
Men's doubles

IBF World Grand Prix 
The World Badminton Grand Prix sanctioned by International Badminton Federation (IBF) from 1983 to 2006.

Men's doubles

References

External links 
 

1968 births
Living people
Sportspeople from Aarhus
Danish male badminton players
Badminton players at the 1992 Summer Olympics
Badminton players at the 1996 Summer Olympics
Olympic badminton players of Denmark
World No. 1 badminton players